The Philippine House Committee on Appropriations, or House Appropriations Committee is a standing committee of the Philippine House of Representatives.

Jurisdiction 
As prescribed by House Rules, the committee's jurisdiction is on the expenditures of the national government which includes the following:
 Creation or abolition and classification of positions in government
 Determination of salaries, allowances and benefits of government personnel
 Payment of public indebtedness

Members, 18th Congress

Historical members

18th Congress

Chairperson 
 Isidro Ungab (Davao City–3rd, HNP) July 24, 2019 – March 2, 2020

Members for the Majority 
 Marissa Andaya (Camarines Sur–1st, NPC)
 Francisco Datol Jr. (SENIOR CITIZENS)
 Nestor Fongwan (Benguet–Lone, PDP–Laban)

See also 
 House of Representatives of the Philippines
 List of Philippine House of Representatives committees

Notes

References

External links 
House of Representatives of the Philippines

Appropriations